Popular Action may refer to:

 Actio popularis, in Roman penal law
 Popular Action (Equatorial Guinea)
 Popular Action (El Salvador)
 Popular Action (Italy)
 Popular Action (Peru)
 Popular Action (Spain)